The Colorado Republican Party is the state affiliate of the Republican Party in the U.S. state of Colorado. The party's headquarters is located in Greenwood Village, Colorado. The state party chair is former state representative Dave Williams.

The Republican Party was dominant in the state as recently as the mid-2000s, however it has greatly declined over the subsequent decades. After the 2020 United States elections, Republicans held the smallest amount of political power in the state government since World War II. This decline has been attributed to various factors, including the party moving too far right for the state, changing demographics, mismanaged campaign money, internal party divisions, a better organized Democratic Party, and the unpopularity of Donald Trump in the state. The party fared even poorer in the 2022 elections, in which Democrats swept every statewide office by a double-digit margin, expanded their dominance in the state's U.S. House delegation, and further expanded their supermajorities in both chambers of the legislature.

In the aftermath of the heavily lopsided results of the 2022 elections, one Republican state representative lamented that “Colorado Republicans need to take this and learn the lesson that the party is dead. This was an extinction-level event.”

Recent history 
Since 2016, the Colorado GOP have shifted more rightward in their political positions and have subsequently embraced Trumpism.

Since Joe Biden defeated Donald Trump in the 2020 presidential election, elements of the Colorado GOP and its voter base have espoused support for Trump's false claims of election fraud. While top Colorado Republicans have defended Colorado's local elections, they have cast doubt on the validity of the election results in other states or stayed silent on Trump's allegations of fraud. On December 7, 2020, a group of Republicans requested to the Speaker of the House KC Becker that a committee be formed on "election integrity" to conduct a audit of the Dominion Voting Systems used in Colorado in spite of no evidence of issues. The request was rejected, with Becker criticizing it as "a dangerous stunt" and a promotion of "debunked conspiracy theories."

Later in December, Republicans tried to utilize the Legislative Audit Committee in an effort to call for an audit of Colorado's election, citing claims of election irregularities despite there being no evidence of widespread fraud. On December 15, the committee found no evidence of fraud and Republican-led motions to launch an audit of the Secretary of State's Office were defeated. The efforts were criticized as being partisan and a misuse of the committee's purpose. Also in December, Colorado congressional Republicans supported a lawsuit aimed to overturn the election results. On January 6, 2021, congressional Republicans from Colorado objected to certify the election results, with Lauren Boebert and  Doug Lamborn objecting to certify the results.

In 2021, while testifying under oath in court in relation to a lawsuit, the leaders of a fringe group revealed that chairwoman Kristi Burton Brown served as president to their organization, FEC United, a far-right group with a militia arm that has promoted conspiracy theories surrounding the 2020 elections, COVID, and QAnon. According to the testimony, Brown was president of the group from November 2020 while serving as vice-chair of the Colorado GOP and later left to run for the chair position for the state GOP in early 2021.

During the 2022 legislative session, fifteen Republican members of the state senate voted in favor of unsuccessful amendments to a resolution on voting rights by thanking the pro-Trump rioters that stormed the Capitol and to decertify the 2020 presidential election.

Current elected officials 

After the 2020 elections, the Colorado Republican Party controls one statewide office and holds  minorities in the Colorado Senate and House of Representatives. Republicans also hold a 3-5 minority in the state's U.S. House delegation.

Members of Congress

U.S. Senate
None

Both of Colorado's U.S. Senate seats have been held by Democrats since 2021. Cory Gardner was the last Republican to represent Colorado in the U.S. Senate. First elected in 2014, Gardner lost his bid for a second term in 2020 to John Hickenlooper who has held the seat since.

U.S. House of Representatives
 CO-03: Lauren Boebert
 CO-04: Ken Buck 
 CO-05: Doug Lamborn

Statewide offices
 None.

Legislative leadership
 Senate Minority Leader: Paul Lundeen
 House Minority Leader: Mike Lynch

Election results

Presidential

Gubernatorial

See also
 Republican Party (United States)
 Political party strength in Colorado

References

External links
 Colorado Republican Party

Republican Party (United States) by state
Politics of Colorado
Political parties in Colorado